Charles D. Lemmond, Jr. (January 17, 1929 – May 30, 2012) was an American politician from Pennsylvania who served as a Republican member of the Pennsylvania State Senate for the 20th District from 1985 to 2006.

Early life and education
Lemmond was born in Hazleton, Pennsylvania to Charles D. and Ruth Zierdt Lemmond.  He grew up and attended school in Forty Fort, Pennsylvania.  He served in the U.S. Army and was stationed in Italy.  He received an A.B. from Harvard University in 1952 and a LL.B. from the University of Pennsylvania Law School.

Career
Lemmond worked as an assistant District Attorney in Luzerne County and in 1979 he was appointed by Governor Dick Thornburgh to fill a vacancy on the Luzerene County Court of Common Pleas. He served until 1981 when he lost the election to the judicial seat.

He served as a member of the Pennsylvania Senate for the 20th district from 1985 to 2006.  He was a member of the Pennsylvania Higher Education Assistance Agency and the Joint Legislative Budget and Finance Committee.

He served on the Impeachment Trial Committee weighing the charges against Pennsylvania Supreme Court Justice Rolf Larsen.  He sponsored legislation to implement hearing screenings for newborns.

Death and legacy
Lemmond died on May 30, 2012, at a hospice in Wilkes-Barre, Pennsylvania and is interred at Memorial Shrine Cemetery in Carverton, Pennsylvania.

References

External links

1929 births
2012 deaths
20th-century American judges
20th-century American politicians
21st-century American politicians
Burials in Pennsylvania
Harvard University alumni
Judges of the Pennsylvania Courts of Common Pleas
Pennsylvania lawyers
Republican Party Pennsylvania state senators
Politicians from Hazleton, Pennsylvania
United States Army soldiers
University of Pennsylvania Law School alumni
20th-century American lawyers